, is a Japanese voice actress from Okayama, Japan who retired for a time in 1992, when her husband was transferred to Milan, Italy.

She returned to Japan and voice work there late in the same decade, now chiefly involved with dubbing of foreign movies and television programs.  Her most recent anime work has been for Mermaid Forest and Star Fox: Assault. During her earlier career,  she was best known for her voice of Kei in Dirty Pair, Smith in Ginga: Nagareboshi Gin and Nakamura in Black Magic M-66. Her last regular role before her brief retirement was as the voice of Kikunosuke Abashiri in Abashiri Family.  She is still currently active through her agency, Aoni Production.

References

External links
 Official agency profile 
 

1956 births
Living people
Voice actresses from Okayama Prefecture
Japanese video game actresses
Japanese voice actresses
Aoni Production voice actors